Rodolfo González (born 14 May 1986 in Caracas) is a retired Venezuelan racing driver.

Career

Formula Renault
After previously competing in karting, González raced in the 2003 Formula Renault 2.0 UK Winter Series, before racing in the main series in 2004 and 2005 while attending City College Norwich.

Formula Three
He won the British F3 International Series National Class in 2006 for T-Sport. In 2007 he continued to show promise by finishing 11th in the 2007 British Formula 3 season with T-Sport.

In 2008, he moved to Carlin Motorsport and the Formula Three Euroseries and endured a miserable season, amassing just half a point in the rain-shortened sprint race at Le Mans.

GP2 Series

He replaced Andreas Zuber for the third round of the 2008–09 GP2 Asia Series season at Sakhir, and finished 16th in his first race. He eventually wound up 23rd in the championship, with a best finish of eighth in the sprint race at Sepang.

González entered the main GP2 Series for the first time as a replacement for Davide Rigon at Trident Racing for the German rounds.

He also competed in Euroseries 3000 in 2009, finishing in fifth position.

González raced for Arden International in the first round of the 2009–10 GP2 Asia Series season before being replaced by Javier Villa. He returned at the final round in Bahrain, replacing Sergio Pérez at Barwa Addax.

González returned to Arden for the 2010 GP2 Series season alongside Charles Pic. He scored four points and finished 21st in the drivers' championship. For 2011, he moved to Trident Racing, where he competed alongside Stefano Coletti. He finished seventeenth in the Asia series and 26th in the main series. He was then signed by Caterham Racing alongside Giedo van der Garde for the 2012 season, in which he finished 22nd in the championship.

Formula One

In 2010 González was given a drive in the Lotus T127 at the end-of-season young driver test in Abu Dhabi, alongside Bulgarian Vladimir Arabadzhiev.

On 14 March 2013 Marussia F1 announced that González would be the team's reserve driver for the 2013 Formula One season. He drove in the practice sessions at the Hungarian, Italian and Korean Grands Prix for Marussia, notably crashing in the latter.

Endurance racing

González competed in the 2014 ELMS Championship with the Murphy Prototypes Endurance Racing Team in the LMP2 category, and the 2014 Le Mans Classic.

IndyCar
González tested IndyCar Series cars in the 2014–2015 off-season with Schmidt Peterson Motorsports and Dale Coyne Racing. He was a surprise addition to the IndyCar Series entry list in the fourth round of the 2015 IndyCar Series season at Barber Motorsports Park in the Dale Coyne No. 18 entry.

Racing record

Career summary

Complete Formula 3 Euro Series results
(key) (Races in bold indicate pole position) (Races in italics indicate fastest lap)

Complete GP2 Series results
(key) (Races in bold indicate pole position) (Races in italics indicate fastest lap)

Complete GP2 Asia Series results
(key) (Races in bold indicate pole position) (Races in italics indicate fastest lap)

Complete Formula One participations
(key) (Races in bold indicate pole position) (Races in italics indicates fastest lap)

24 Hours of Le Mans results

Complete Formula Acceleration 1 results
(key) (Races in bold indicate pole position) (Races in italics indicate fastest lap)

Complete European Le Mans Series results

Complete IndyCar Series results
(key)

References

External links
 
 

1986 births
Living people
24 Hours of Le Mans drivers
People from Caracas
Venezuelan racing drivers
Dutch Formula Renault 2.0 drivers
British Formula Three Championship drivers
British Formula Renault 2.0 drivers
GP2 Series drivers
GP2 Asia Series drivers
Auto GP drivers
European Le Mans Series drivers
IndyCar Series drivers
People educated at City College Norwich
Manor Motorsport drivers
T-Sport drivers
Carlin racing drivers
Scuderia Coloni drivers
Trident Racing drivers
Arden International drivers
Campos Racing drivers
Murphy Prototypes drivers
Dale Coyne Racing drivers
RC Motorsport drivers
Caterham Racing drivers
Mark Burdett Motorsport drivers